John Meinhard VII, Count of Gorizia (1378 or 1380 – 22 May 1430) was a member of the Meinhardiner dynasty.  He was a Count Palatine of Carinthia and a Count of Kirchberg.

John Meinhard was a son of Count Meinhard VI and his second wife, Utehild, who was a daughter of Ulirch IV of Mätsch.  When his father died in 1385, his elder brother  Henry VI inherited Gorizia and John Meinhard VII was promised the County of Kirchberg, from the inheritance of his mother, and the position of Count Palatine in Carinthia.

Johann Meinhard VII married twice. He first married in 1404, to Magdalena of Bavaria, the daughter of the Duke  Frederick "the Wise" of Bavaria.  In 1422, he married his second wife; she was Agnes, a daughter of Count Bernard of Pettau-Wurmberg.  No children from these two marriages are known.  He was succeeded as Count of Kirchberg by his brother Henry VI.

External links 
 Genealogy of John Meinhard VII

Counts of Gorizia
14th-century births
1430 deaths
15th-century people of the Holy Roman Empire